This page presents a list of the longest road tunnels of the world.

World's longest road tunnels in use

Under construction

Timeline of world record lengths

See also

 List of longest tunnels
 List of long tunnels by type
 List of long road tunnels in China

Notes

References

Tunnels, road
Tunnels, road
Road